Poienarii Burchii is a commune in Prahova County, Muntenia, Romania. It is composed of eight villages: Cărbunari, Ologeni, Piorești, Podu Văleni, Poienarii Burchii, Poienarii-Rali, Poienarii Vechi and Tătărăi.

Natives
 Ștefan Tudor

References

Communes in Prahova County
Localities in Muntenia